Dixie is a census-designated place (CDP) in Fayette and Nicholas counties, West Virginia, United States. Dixie has a post office with ZIP code 25059. As of the 2010 census, its population was 291, with 202 residents in Nicholas County and 89 in Fayette County.

The community was named after Dixie, a nickname for the Southern United States, because a share of the first settlers were southerners.

References

Census-designated places in Fayette County, West Virginia
Census-designated places in Nicholas County, West Virginia
Census-designated places in West Virginia